The W. L. Mead House is a historic house located at 380 West Del Mar Boulevard in Pasadena, California. Architect Louis B. Easton designed the American Craftsman house, which was built for W. L. Mead in 1910. The house is a two-story wood-frame structure with a brick foundation. The front-facing gable roof has wide eaves inspired by the Swiss chalet style. Both the roof and the second floor of the house are sided with wood shingles, a distinctive Craftsman feature; the first floor has a stucco exterior. The house also features a terrace covered by a wooden shed roof and supported by brick piers.

The house was added to the National Register of Historic Places on August 6, 1998.

References

External links

Mead House - Pasadena Digital History Collaboration

Houses on the National Register of Historic Places in California
Houses completed in 1910
Buildings and structures on the National Register of Historic Places in Pasadena, California
American Craftsman architecture in California
Houses in Pasadena, California